Teenage Depression is the debut studio album by English rock band Eddie and the Hot Rods. The album was mixed by Jonz:A and R Howard Thomson and produced by Ed Hollis and Vic Maile. It reached number 43 on the UK Albums Chart.

The album's title track reached number 35 on the UK Singles Chart and was featured in the 1979 film Rock 'n' Roll High School. The album contains three cover songs, The Who's "The Kids Are Alright", Joe Tex's "Show Me", and Sam Cooke's "Shake".

Teenage Depression has been cited as a "missing link" between pub rock and punk rock, owing to its fast and hard-hitting R&B sound showing the attitude of a punk band. In 2000, a reissue was released with 12 additional tracks.

Track listing
All songs written by Dave Higgs, except where noted.
"Get Across to You" – 2:48
"Why Can't It Be?" – 2:33
"Show Me" (Joe Tex) – 2:03
"All I Need Is Money" – 2:21
"Double Checkin' Woman" – 2:29
"The Kids Are Alright" (Pete Townshend) – 2:40
"Teenage Depression" – 2:59
"Horseplay (Wearier of the Schmaltz)" – 2:22
"Been So Long" – 3:22
"Shake" (Sam Cooke) – 1:30
"On the Run" – 6:26
	
2000 reissue bonus tracks
"Writing on the Wall" – 2:42
"Cruisin (In the Lincoln)" – 3:33
"Wooly Bully" (Domingo Samudio) – 2:37
"Horseplay" (Single Version) – 2:24
"96 Tears" (Live) (Rudy Martinez) – 2:58
"Get Out of Denver" (Live) (Bob Seger) – 3:51
"Medley: Gloria / Satisfaction" (Live) (Van Morrison/Mick Jagger, Keith Richards) – 5:24
"On the Run" (Live) – 9:02
"Hard Drivin Man" (Live) – 2:11
"Horseplay" (Live) – 2:30
"Double Checkin' Woman" (Live) – 2:37
"All I Need Is Money" (Live) – 2:56

Personnel
Eddie and the Hot Rods
Barrie Masters – vocals
 Paul Gray – bass, backing vocals
Steve Nicol – drums, backing vocals
Dave Higgs – guitar, backing vocals, piano on "Horseplay (Wearier of the Schmaltz)"
Technical
Michael Beal – art direction, photography
Howard Thompson - A&R

Charts

Singles

References

1976 debut albums
Eddie and the Hot Rods albums
Albums produced by Vic Maile
Island Records albums